Sämi Landscape Conservation Area is a nature park which is located in Lääne-Viru County, Estonia.

The area of the nature park is 946 ha.

The protected area was founded in 1981 to protect Sämi-Kuristiku Wetland Protection Area. In 2005, the protected area was designated to the landscape conservation area.

References

Nature reserves in Estonia
Geography of Lääne-Viru County